The 1954 United States Senate special election in New Hampshire took place on November 2, 1954, to elect a U.S. Senator to complete the unexpired term of Senator Charles W. Tobey, who died on July 24, 1953. Former President of the New Hampshire Bar Association Robert W. Upton was appointed on August 14, 1953 by Governor Hugh Gregg to fill the vacancy until a special election could be held.

Upton was defeated in the Republican primary by Congressman Norris Cotton, who went on to defeat Democratic nominee Stanley J. Betley.

Primary elections
Primary elections were held on September 14, 1954.

Democratic primary

Candidates
Stanley J. Betley, State Representative
Laurence M. Pickett, Mayor of Keene

Results

Republican primary

Candidates
Norris Cotton, incumbent U.S. Representative
Wesley Powell, attorney, independent candidate for U.S. Senator in 1950
Robert W. Upton, incumbent U.S. Senator

Results

General election

Results

See also 
 1954 United States Senate elections

References

Bibliography
 
 

1954
New Hampshire
United States Senate
New Hampshire 1954
New Hampshire 1954
United States Senate 1954